"No Roots" is the debut song by German-Irish singer Alice Merton. Merton co-wrote the song with producer Nicolas Rebscher. The song was released in Europe through Paper Plane Records in 2016 and in the United States by Mom + Pop Music on 2 February 2018.

The song has reached the top 10 in Germany, Italy, Austria, France, Luxembourg, Poland, Slovenia, and Israel, and reached the top 20 in Switzerland, and reached number 84 on the US Billboard Hot 100. The song has been certified Gold in the United States (RIAA), Platinum in Germany (BVMI) and France (SNEP). It was added to the 'A' List of the digital UK station Radio X in March 2018 and was also receiving airplay on BBC Radio 1 and the UK's most popular station BBC Radio 2.

Writing
After moving from Canada to Germany, Merton wrote her first song, "Little Lighthouse", a song "about finding my way back home", she told Billboard. Moving a total of 12 times in 24 years inspired her to write the song. "No Roots" came together while she was visiting her parents in England. "I got to a point where I was feeling quite lost. So I decided to write a song that would make me feel better", she explained.

Release and promotion
The original release date of the single, "No Roots" was scheduled for 18 November 2016 but was delayed until 2 December 2016. In the UK, Merton was part of the BBC Introducing radio programme on 18 March 2017. She appeared on television, at prime time in the ProSieben show, Schlag den Henssler. On 9 February 2018 she also appeared for the first time on The Tonight Show Starring Jimmy Fallon performing "No Roots". Later, Merton featured on the Viva Top 100 and VIVA elevator music. Beginning in May 2017, "No Roots" is used as the soundtrack for an official commercial of Vodafone Germany. On 12 April 2018, Merton performed the song live during the German Echo Music Prize.

Critical reception
Mike Jones of WWDC (FM) exclaimed that "No Roots" is "the start of greatness". The song received a similar reception on WGN-TV, with WGN Music Producer Tom Barnas claiming that Merton "slayed it". Hype Machine and music blogs positively received Merton's single, "No Roots". According to Nielsen Music, in the United States, the song has been streamed 922,000 times as of August 2017. Eleanor Pettipher of Fortitude Magazine wrote that "track is kept fresh and catchy by the undulating baseline [sic] and backing vocal emphasis on 'roots'". Front View Magazine remarks that with success, the song "seems to sum up the life of the English/German singer". Matthew Kent of The Line of Best Fit remarks that the song is "brought together perfectly by the powerful, repeating refrain". Indie Obsessive stated that "No Roots" is "the most recent humility check. The song was released months ago. It was interesting, but not blogworthy. Over time, the attraction to the song grew".

Year-end lists
Billboard magazine named "No Roots" the 81st best song of 2017.

Usage in other media
The song was featured in a Mini car commercial in 2018, as well as the fifth season of the television series The Blacklist. It was also used by dancers in Dancing On Ice, a British TV show, and in week 2 of the U.K. show Strictly Come Dancing in 2018 where Kate Silverton and Aljaz Skorjanec danced a tango to it.

The song was featured in the Brazilian soap opera Segundo Sol. It was also featured during several Sunday Night Football games on NBC during the 2018 regular season.

An instrumental version of the song was used in a series of 2019 and 2020 Miracle-Gro advertisements that aired in the US.

The song was also used in American television series "Deception".

The song was performed by Australian band 5 Seconds of Summer at the BBC Live Lounge.

In May 2021, the song started to go viral on TikTok, appearing in 1 million videos.

In 2022, the song was featured in the Polish Netflix film Heart Parade.

Charts

Weekly charts

Year-end charts

Certifications

References

2016 songs
2016 debut singles
British synth-pop songs
Canadian synth-pop songs
English songs
English-language German songs
German synth-pop songs
Number-one singles in Iceland